Sellon is a surname. Notable people with the surname include:

Charles Sellon (1870–1937), American actor
Edward Sellon (1818–1866), British writer, translator, and illustrator
George C. Sellon (1881—1954), American architect
Lydia Sellon (1821–1876), British founder of an Anglican women's order